Edwards Island, also known as Edward Island, is an island in Western Australia near Lancelin.

It is composed of limestone and is linked to Lancelin Island by intertidal and subtidal reef platforms. Both islands are gazetted as A Class nature reserves.

The first European to discover the island was the French explorer Hamelin in 1801 aboard the Naturalist, who named Lancelin Island.

See also
 List of islands of Western Australia

References

Nature reserves in Western Australia
Islands of the Wheatbelt (Western Australia)
Turquoise Coast (Western Australia)